Macoun may refer to:

People
Jamie Macoun (born 1961), Canadian ice hockey player
John Macoun (1831–1920), Irish-Canadian naturalist
Franz Macoun (1881–1951), German politician

Places
Macoun, Saskatchewan, Canadian village
Macoun Field Club, naturalists' club in Ottawa
Macoun marsh in Ottawa

Other
Macoun apple, an apple cultivar
Tulák Macoun, 1939 Czechoslovakian film
Limnanthes macounii or Macoun's meadowfoam
Macoun Developers Conference, an Apple developer conference.